American Samoa competed at the 2019 Pacific Games in Apia, Samoa from 7 to 20 July 2019. The country participated in 16 sports at the 2019 games.

Athletics

Basketball

5x5

Men's basketball
 TBC

Women's basketball
 TBC

3x3

Men
 TBC

Women
 TBC

Boxing

Football

Men's football

Squad
Head coach: Tunoa Lui

Group Play

Women's football

Squad
TBC

Golf

American Samoa qualified eight players for the 2019 tournament:

Women
 Margaret Gadalla
 Amelie Chen
 Kimberly Tolmie-Brewster
 Moeroa Hardman

Men
 Alfred Hollister
 Polo Fruean Jr
 Tuli Fruean
 Pemerika Gillet

Netball

Outrigger canoeing

Powerlifting

Rugby sevens

Men's sevens

Women's sevens

Sailing

Swimming

Tennis

Triathlon

Volleyball

Beach volleyball

Volleyball (Indoor)

Weightlifting

References

Nations at the 2019 Pacific Games
2019